Jan Johansen (born 3 December 1944) is a retired Norwegian canoeist. He competed in the four-man 1000 m sprint at the 1968 and 1972 Olympics and won a gold and a bronze medal, respectively. Between 1966 and 1971 Søby collected two gold and three silver medals in two-man and four-man 10,000 m events at the world and European championships.

References

External links

1944 births
Canoeists at the 1968 Summer Olympics
Canoeists at the 1972 Summer Olympics
Living people
Norwegian male canoeists
Olympic canoeists of Norway
Olympic gold medalists for Norway
Olympic bronze medalists for Norway
Olympic medalists in canoeing
ICF Canoe Sprint World Championships medalists in kayak
Medalists at the 1972 Summer Olympics
Medalists at the 1968 Summer Olympics
Sportspeople from Tønsberg